João Pedro Santos Lameira (born 19 April 1999) is a Portuguese professional footballer who plays for SCU Torreense as a midfielder.

Club career
On 22 September 2018, Lameira made his professional debut with FC Porto B in a 2017–18 LigaPro match against Oliveirense.

Honours

International
Portugal
UEFA European Under-17 Championship: 2016

References

External links

1999 births
Living people
Sportspeople from Santa Maria da Feira
Portuguese footballers
Association football midfielders
Liga Portugal 2 players
Campeonato de Portugal (league) players
C.D. Feirense players
Sporting CP footballers
Padroense F.C. players
FC Porto players
FC Porto B players
U.D. Leiria players
Associação Académica de Coimbra – O.A.F. players
Real S.C. players